Shiho Fujimura (藤村 志保 Fujimura Shiho, born 3 January 1939 in Kawasaki, Kanagawa Prefecture, Japan) is a Japanese actress. She was given a Special Prize for her career at the 2008 Yokohama Film Festival.

Filmography

Films
Shinobi no Mono (1962)
Kujira Gami (1962)
Shinobi no Mono 2: Vengeance (1963)
Zatoichi on the Road (1963)
Akumyō Muteki (1965)
Return Of Daimajin (1966)
Shiroi Kyotō (1966)
Zatoichi's Cane Sword (1967)
The Snow Woman (1968)
Fumō Chitai (1976)
Tora-san Plays Cupid (1977)
Kozure Ōkami: Sono Chiisaki Te ni (1993)
Bloom in the Moonlight (1993), Tatsu Taki
Wait and See (1998)
Gemini (1999)
Merdeka 17805 (2001)
Inugami (2001)
Yunagi City, Sakura Country (2007)
Inju: The Beast in the Shadow (2008)

Television
Taikōki (1965), Nene
Ōgon no Hibi (1978), Yodo-dono
Musashibō Benkei (1986), Tokiwa Gozen
Taiheiki (1991), Uesugi Kiyoko
Fūrin Kazan (2007), Jukei-ni

References

External links

Profile at JMDb 

Japanese actresses
1939 births
Living people
People from Kawasaki, Kanagawa
Taiga drama lead actors